Raised in Captivity is the sixth and final solo album by English rock musician John Wetton prior to his death in 2017. It was released on July 1, 2011.

Track listing

Personnel
John Wetton – vocals, acoustic guitar, bass guitar and keyboards; cover and booklet concepts
Billy Sherwood – guitars, drums and percussion; production

Additional musicians
Mick Box – guitar (on "New Star Rising")
Geoff Downes – keyboard (on "Goodbye Elsinore" and "Steffi's Ring")
Steve Hackett – guitar (on "Goodbye Elsinore")
Eddie Jobson – violin (on "The Devil and the Opera House")
Tony Kaye – Hammond organ (on "Human Condition" and "Don't Misunderstand Me")
Alex Machacek – guitar (on "The Last Night of My Life")
Steve Morse – guitar (on "Lost for Words")
Anneke van Giersbergen – duetting vocals (on "Mighty Rivers")

Technical personnel
Michael Inns – artwork and photography
Karen Gladwell – artwork and photography
Carla Huntington – additional photo

Release history

References
Notes

Citations

External links
Official John Wetton website

John Wetton albums
2011 albums
Progressive rock albums by English artists
Pop rock albums by English artists
Hard rock albums by English artists
Frontiers Records albums